Bruno Bicocchi (born 8 June 1955) is a French sprint canoer who competed in the late 1970s. At the 1976 Summer Olympics in Montreal, he was eliminated in the semifinals of the K-2 500 m event.

References
Sports-reference.com profile

External links

1955 births
Canoeists at the 1976 Summer Olympics
French male canoeists
Living people
Olympic canoeists of France
Place of birth missing (living people)